"Night and Day" is a song by Jamaican recording artist Dawn Penn from her debut studio album, No, No, No (1994). The song was originally written by Augustus Pablo as "Baby I Love You So", but on Penn's album it appeared as "Night and Day". It was later re-titled "Night and Day (Baby I Love You So)" for the single release.

The song was released as the second single from Penn's debut studio album No, No, No, as a follow-up to the worldwide hit "You Don't Love Me (No, No, No)". Unlike its predecessor, "Night & Day" was not successful in music charts, only entering charts in the UK, where it stayed for two weeks, peaking at number 81 in September 1994. Its music video was filmed in Brooklyn's Prospect Park. The song was used in Brett Ratner's 2004 film After the Sunset, starring Pierce Brosnan and Salma Hayek.

Formats
 CD maxi single
 "Night and Day (Baby I Love You So)" (Radio Edit)
 "Night and Day (Baby I Love You So)" (Augustus Pablo Mix #1)
 "Night and Day (Baby I Love You So)" (Augustus Pablo Mix #2)
 "Night and Day (Baby I Love You So)" (Augustus Pablo Mix #3)
 "Night and Day (Baby I Love You So)" (Version #2)
 "Night and Day (Baby I Love You So)" (Extended Dance Mix)
 "Night and Day (Baby I Love You So)" (Roots Dub)

 12" single
 "Night and Day (Baby I Love You So)" (Augustus Pablo Mix #1)
 "Night and Day (Baby I Love You So)" (Augustus Pablo Mix #2)
 "Night and Day (Baby I Love You So)" (Version #1)
 "Night and Day (Baby I Love You So)" (Roots Dub)
 "Night and Day (Baby I Love You So)" (Alternative Dub)

Charts

References

1994 singles
1994 songs
Big Beat Records (American record label) singles
Dawn Penn songs